This list is of the Places of Scenic Beauty of Japan located within the Prefecture of Toyama.

National Places of Scenic Beauty
As of 1 August 2014, two Places have been designated at a national level (including one *Special Place of Scenic Beauty); Landscape of Oku no Hosomichi is a serial designation spanning ten prefectures.

Prefectural Places of Scenic Beauty
As of 1 May 2014, three sites have been designated at a prefectural level.

Municipal Places of Scenic Beauty
As of 1 May 2014, twenty-one sites have been designated at a municipal level.

See also
 Cultural Properties of Japan
 List of Historic Sites of Japan (Toyama)
 List of parks and gardens of Toyama Prefecture

References

External links
 Places of Scenic Beauty of Toyama Prefecture 

Tourist attractions in Toyama Prefecture
Places of Scenic Beauty